Corey Sanders (born 1975) is an American professional boxer.

Corey Sanders may also refer to:

 Corey I. Sanders, COO of MGM Resorts International
 Corey Sanders (basketball) (born 1997), American basketball player

See also
 Corrie Sanders (1966–2012), South African professional boxer